Gladstone Park Secondary College is a public state school in Melbourne, founded in 1975.

Introduction

The school has around More than  1500 students, a figure which has remained roughly constant for over a decade. When it first opened, Gladstone Park Secondary School (GPSC) quickly became the largest school in terms of matriculated students within a 10 km radius, a position which it still holds today.

Uniform
The school's uniforms were brown and gold up until the early 1990s, when the school council introduced a uniform consisting of a white polo shirt with a green logo and grey cotton shorts in summer for boys and a green chequered dress for girls. The winter uniform consists of grey cotton pants and a green cotton jumper with a yellow emblem for both boys and girls. Year 12s traditionally wore a dark blue jumper with classmates' names in printed in white on the front and back. In 2009 the blue was changed to black. Since 2010 each year has had a unique design. In 2012, further additions were made to the school uniform and students can now be seen wearing blazers and/or neck ties along with the original uniform.

School life

The school has a special disability partnership with the local TAFE institutes, where most GPSC graduates enrol to do apprenticeships or diplomas.

Facilities
The school grounds contain many sports facilities including a football and soccer oval, outdoor basketball and netball courts, cricket nets and an outdoor hockey/ futsal pitch. There is an indoor sports centre with two basketball courts, squash courts and gym facilities. The school library is open to students and the public.

A joint senior school office and year 12 study centre building opened in 2017.

Incident 
On 1 March 2017, an intruder broke into the school in the early hours of the morning. They broke into forty Year 12 students' lockers and stole textbooks, scientific calculators and other objects. However, the school decided to not compensate the students for the theft of their valuables because the school was not "entirely at fault". This caused major uproar among students & parents, especially because students had "hours and hours of notes" that had been prepared for their VCE subjects.

Alumni
Sport
Aziz Behich – Professional footballer for Süper Lig club Bursaspor
Corey McKernan – Former Australian rules footballer
Jordan Bannister – Former Australian rules football player and umpire
Australian Defence Force
Cameron Baird – recipient of the Victoria Cross for Australia.

Reference List 

Secondary schools in Melbourne
Educational institutions established in 1975
1975 establishments in Australia
Buildings and structures in the City of Hume